Thick Skinned is a 1989 French drama film directed by Patricia Mazuy. It was screened in the Un Certain Regard section at the 1989 Cannes Film Festival.

Cast
 Sandrine Bonnaire - Annie
 Jean-François Stévenin - Roland
 Jacques Spiesser - Gérard
 Salomé Stévenin - Anna
 Laure Duthilleul - Sophie
 Jean-François Gallotte - Jack Vrel
 Pierre Forget - Armand
 Yann Dedet - Bérino
 Jean-Jacques Bernard - Butcher Riri

References

External links

1989 films
French drama films
1980s French-language films
1989 drama films
Films directed by Patricia Mazuy
1980s French films